The A22 autoroute is a toll free highway in north western France. The road forms part of European route E17 from Paris to Belgium and the low countries through the Roubaix conurbation.

Junctions

References

External links

 A22 Motorway on Saratlas

A22